Katghara may refer to:

 Katghara, Deoria, Uttar Pradesh, India
 Katghara, Jaunpur, Uttar Pradesh, India